Duckeella is a genus of orchids (family Orchidaceae), belonging to the subfamily Vanilloideae. It has 3 known species, all native to South America:

The genus name of Duckesia is in honour of Adolpho Ducke (1876–1959), an entomologist, botanist and ethnographer specializing in Amazonia. It was first published and described in Anais Reunião Sul-Amer. Bot. Vol.3 on page 31 in 1938 (published 1939).

List of species 
Duckeella adolphii Porto & Brade - Venezuela and Brazil 
Duckeella alticola C.Schweinf. - Venezuela, Brazil and possibly Guyana
Duckeella pauciflora Garay - Venezuela and Colombia

References 

Vanilloideae genera
Pogonieae
Orchids of South America
Plants described in 1938